Chuck Norris is an American actor and martial artist. He has appeared in a number of action films, such as Way of the Dragon, in which he starred alongside Bruce Lee, and was The Cannon Group's leading star in the 1980s. He played the starring role in the television series Walker, Texas Ranger, from 1993 to 2001.

Film

Television

Video games

References

 General sources

External links
 
 

Filmography
Norris, Chuck
Norris, Chuck